Park Kun-bae (born October 25, 1948) served as President of the Boy Scouts of Korea, and as a member of the World Scout Committee.

Background
In 1999, Park was awarded the 277th Bronze Wolf, the only distinction of the World Organization of the Scout Movement, awarded by the World Scout Committee for exceptional services to world Scouting, as well as the highest distinction of the Scout Association of Japan, the Golden Pheasant Award.

See also

Haitai

References

Recipients of the Bronze Wolf Award
1948 births
Scouting in South Korea
Living people
South Korean businesspeople
New York University alumni
Kyungbock High School alumni
People from Seoul